Cave living may refer to:
 Human cave dwellers
 Troglobites and Trogloxenes, cave-dwelling animals
 Underground living in caves

See also
 Caving
 Cave diving
 Cave painting